BioDiscovery Toronto (BDT) is an organization of nine non-profit biomedical research institutions in Toronto.

The organization acts as a clearing house for private companies seeking biomedical expertise. It gives access to research and biomedical facilities.

The member institutions are:
 the Centre for Addiction and Mental Health
 Mount Sinai Hospital
 Toronto Metropolitan University
 St. Michael's Hospital
 Sunnybrook Health Sciences Centre
 The Hospital for Sick Children
 Toronto Rehabilitation Institute
 the University Health Network
 the University of Toronto

References

External links
 Official website

Technology transfer